Wennberg is a Swedish surname. Notable people with the surname include:

Alexander Wennberg (born 1994), Swedish ice hockey player
Erik Wennberg (1910–1982), Swedish middle-distance runner
John Wennberg (born 1934), American medical scientist
Lotten Wennberg (1815–1864), Swedish philanthropist
Paul Wennberg, American atmospheric scientist
Samuel Georg Simeon Wennberg (1836–1908), Norwegian politician

See also
Wennerberg

Swedish-language surnames